Victor Eftimiu (24 January 1889 – 27 November 1972) was a Romanian poet and playwright. He was a contributor to Sburătorul, a Romanian literary magazine. His works have been performed in the State Jewish Theater of Romania.

Eftimiu was of Albanian origin, but also had Aromanian descent through his father Gheorghe Eftimiu, a merchant. Eftimiu's mother was Maria Eftimiu, née Cociu. Victor Eftimiu was born in Boboshticë near Korçë. In 1905, he emigrated from Albania to Romania, where he found work as a theatre manager in 1913. He published several books of poetry, and wrote comedies and satirical pieces for the theatre. He also wrote a volume of Romanian fairy tales, and several children's books. He wrote also criticisms and articles for numerous magazines.

He died in 1972 and was buried at Bellu Cemetery.

Eftimiu lived in a house next to the Cișmigiu Gardens, in central Bucharest. Streets in Arad, Cluj-Napoca, and Pitești are also named after him.

Works

Plays 
 Înșir-te mărgărite (1911)
 Cocoșul negru (1913)
 Rapsozii (1913)
 Napoleon (1914)
 Akim (1914)
 Ringala (1915)
 Prometeu (1920)
 Inspectorul broaștelor (1922)
 Comoara (1922)
  Dansul milioanelor (1922)
 Don Juan (1922)
 Thebaida (1924)
 Meșterul Manole (1925)
 Glafira (1926)
 Fantoma celei care va veni (1928)
 Omul care a văzut moartea (1928)
 Marele duhovnic (1929)
 Daniela (1931)
 Theochrys (1932)
 Poiana de aur (1933)
 Stele căzătoare (1936)
 Atrizii (1939)
 Haiducii (1947)
 Doctor Faust - vrăjitor (1957)
 Parada  (1959)
 Halatul alb (1959)
 Omul de piatră (1966)
 Fetele Didinei (1968)
 Pană Lesnea Rusalim
 Strămoșii
 Crinul vieții

Poems 
 Poemele singurătății (1912) 
 Candele stinse (1915)
 Lebedele sacre (1920)
 Cântecul milei (1925)
 Noaptea subterană (1933)
 Oglinzile (1939)
 Cântecul mamei și al copilului (1939)
 13 decembrie și alte poeme (1947)
 Odă limbii române  (1957)
 Soliile terestre (1961)
 Poezii (1964)
 Crizanteme

References 

1889 births
1972 deaths
People from Korçë
People from Manastir vilayet
Albanian people of Aromanian descent
Romanian people of Aromanian descent
People from the Ottoman Empire of Aromanian descent
Albanian expatriates in Romania
20th-century Romanian poets
Romanian male poets
Romanian dramatists and playwrights
Male dramatists and playwrights
20th-century Romanian dramatists and playwrights
20th-century Romanian male writers
Chairpersons of the National Theatre Bucharest
Titular members of the Romanian Academy
Burials at Bellu Cemetery
Recipients of the Legion of Honour